A call girl or female escort is a prostitute who (unlike a street walker) does not display her profession to the general public, nor does she usually work in an institution like a brothel, although she may be employed by an escort agency. The client must make an appointment, usually by calling a telephone number.
Call girls often advertise their services in small ads in magazines and via the Internet, although an intermediary advertiser, such as an escort agency, may be involved in promoting escorts, while, less often, some may be handled by a pimp.
Call girls may work either incall, where the client comes to them, or outcall, where they go to the client. Some porn stars are known to escort as well.

Internet
Many call girl agencies and independent call girls have their own websites. The internet has become the main medium through which customers find their desired escort. Generally, a picture of the woman is provided, and sometimes, the type of sexual services she offers.

See also
 Camgirl
 Delivery health
 Ashley Alexandra Dupré
 Geisha, a class of female Japanese performance artists often confused with sex workers.
 Girlfriend experience
 Suzy Favor Hamilton, former Olympic athlete who was revealed in 2012 to have been moonlighting as a high-end call girl.
 Xaviera Hollander
 Jillian Lauren, American writer and former call girl for Jefri Bolkiah, Prince of Brunei about whom she wrote the memoir Some Girls: My Life in a Harem.
 Internet prostitution
 Male prostitution ("call boy")
 Prostitution
 Punternet
 Secret Diary of a Call Girl, a British television series.
 Sugar baby
 The Erotic Review

References

External links
 "The $2,000 an-Hour Woman" by Mark Jacobson, New York Magazine, 18 July 2005.

Sex industry
Prostitutes by type
Escorts
Gendered occupations